The 1952–53 Kansas Jayhawks men's basketball team represented the University of Kansas during the 1952–53 college men's basketball season.

Roster
B. H. Born
Allen Kelley
Dean Kelley
Hal Patterson
Gil Reich
Larry Davenport
Bill Heitholt
Dean Smith
Jerry Alberts
Eldon Nicholson
John Anderson
LaVannes Squires
Ken Buller
Marvin Deckert
Jerry Taylor
Wes Whitney
Jack Wolfe
Everett Dye
Wes Johnson

Schedule

Rankings

References

Kansas Jayhawks men's basketball seasons
Kansas
NCAA Division I men's basketball tournament Final Four seasons
Kansas
Kansas
Kansas